"Castle" (subtitled "The Huntsman: Winter's War Version") is a song by American singer and songwriter Halsey. Originally recorded for her debut studio album, Badlands (2015), it was re-recorded for the soundtrack to the 2016 film The Huntsman: Winter's War. It was released on April 9, 2016, through Capitol Records as a single from the soundtrack as well as the fourth single from Badlands. "Castle" was co-written by Halsey and the track's producer, Lido. The song was used in commercials and in the teaser trailer to promote the film. The song has background vocals of a choir singing Agnus Dei. She is singing about taking the throne and the kingdom are locked up, which is a reference to her album Badlands.

Background
TBA

Composition
The song is in a key of G minor.

Music video
A "Behind-the-Scenes" video was released for the song on Halsey's official Vevo channel on YouTube on April 8, 2016, one day prior to the single's digital download release. Five days later, on April 13, 2016, the official music video was released on Halsey's Vevo account. As of June 2022, the music video has received over 72 million views on YouTube.

In the media
The album version of "Castle" was featured in TV shows The Royals, iZombie, and The Originals. The Huntsman: Winter's War version of "Castle" was featured in TV show Dance Moms.

Track listing
Digital download
"Castle (The Huntsman: Winter's War version)" – 4:20

Chart performance

Certifications

References

2015 songs
2016 singles
Halsey (singer) songs
Astralwerks singles
Capitol Records singles
Songs written by Halsey (singer)
Songs written by Lido (musician)